MTH racing engines are two-stroke lightweight engines, built by an Austrian company, MTH. They are used in motocross sidecars and ultra lightweight aeroplanes. 

From 2000 to 2002, the Latvian sidecarcross rider Kristers Serģis won three world championships with an MTH motor.

Sidecarcross world championships
Kristers Serģis / Artis Rasmanis - MTH-BSU - 2000-02

Aircraft engines

MTH R 422-CG

References
 The world championship on sidecarcross.com
 The official FIM website

External links

Two-stroke gasoline engines
Sidecarcross